Priaulx is a name of French origin, and may refer to:

 Andy Priaulx (born 1974), British professional racing driver from Guernsey
 Priaulx Rainier (190386), South African-British composer
 Priaulx League, an association football league on the island of Guernsey
 Priaulx Library, located in St Peter Port, Guernsey
 Sebastian Priaulx (born 2001), British racing driver from Guernsey

See also